Giona A. Nazzaro (born 1 June 1965 in Zurich, Switzerland) is the Artistic Director of the Locarno Film Festival.

He is also the General Delegate of the Venice International Film Critics’ Week. and a member of the selection committee at the International Film Festival Rotterdam and he collaborates with the Locarno Film Festival and the Visions du Réel Nyon. He is a board member  of the European Film Awards. He was named the artistic director of the Locarno Film Festival in November 2020 after the resignation of Lili Hinstin.

A member of the Union of Italian Film Critics (SNCCI) Nazzaro is a regular contributor to the Italian newspaper Il Manifesto and the bymonthly magazine MicroMega.

He is the author of several books on cinema: Il cinema di Hong Kong – Spade, kung fu, pistole, fantasmi (Le mani, 1997), John Woo – La nuova leggenda del cinema d'azione (Castelvecchi, 2000); Il dizionario dei film di Hong Kong (Universitaria Editrice, 2005), Action – Forme di un transgenere cinematografico (Le mani, 2000) and Il conflitto delle idee. Al cinema con MicroMega (Bietti, 2014). Nazzaro is also the author of the novel A Mon Dragone c'è il Diavolo (Perdisa Pop, 2010).

References

External links
 Locarno Film Festival Official website.
 Venice International Film Critics’ Week Official website.
 Screen Daily on the Venice International Film Critics’ Week.
 European Film Awards Official website.

1965 births
Living people
Italian film critics